Maureen Moore  was National Co-ordinator, then Director of Scottish AIDS Monitor from its inception in 1983.  

After leaving SAM, Maureen went on to Chair the Scottish voluntary sector's HIV and AIDS forum and the Board of Project for HIV/AIDS Care and Education (PHACE West) in Glasgow. This enabled her to continue lobbying for improved awareness of heterosexual transmission of HIV and better education and HIV prevention services for gay men.  

In 1995 Maureen took over from Alison Hillhouse as Chief Executive at ASH Scotland where she supported the ban on smoking in workplaces in Scotland  and the ban on tobacco sales to under 18s.  

She was awarded an OBE for services to healthcare in 2006.

See also 

 Smoking, Health and Social Care (Scotland) Act

References 

Scottish activists
HIV/AIDS activism